St. Francis Seminary may refer to:

St. Francis Seminary (Ohio) 
St. Francis Seminary (Wisconsin)